The 1898 Boston College football team was an American football team that represented Boston College as an independent during the 1898 college football season. Led by second-year head coach John Dunlop, Boston College compiled a record of 2–5–1.

Schedule

References

Boston College
Boston College Eagles football seasons
Boston College football
19th century in Boston